A Course in Phonetics is a textbook by Peter Ladefoged and Keith Allan Johnson designed for an introductory course in phonetics.

Reception
The book was reviewed by Laurie Bauer, J. C. Wells, Timothy Riney, Lisa Davidson, Douglas Pulleyblank, Julia Roberts and Dwan Shipley.

References

External links
A Course in Phonetics

Phonetics books
Linguistics textbooks
1975 non-fiction books
Cengage books
Harcourt (publisher) books